Crossroads Mall was a shopping mall located at the intersection of U.S. Route 19 and Roosevelt Boulevard on the border of Clearwater and Largo, Florida.

History
The mall was opened in September 1984 as Bay Area Outlet Mall. Two years after the complex opened, its owners were asked by Pinellas County officials to pay for road improvements necessitated by mall traffic. Original tenants included TJ Maxx and Bealls. Although the mall was foreclosed on in 1997, a Ross Dress for Less store was added the same year.

By early 2005, the complex was almost entirely vacant and slated for redevelopment. In 2005, Walmart announced that it would buy the mall and replace it with a supercenter, but the plan ultimately fell through.

The property was purchased by developer Boulder Venture South LLC for $26 million in May 2005. At the time, only seven stores remained in operation. It officially closed its doors in August 2005, and has been demolished, with part of the property now occupied by a strip mall and a Cheddar's Casual Café. At the end of 2013 a new Walmart opened in the west side of the property, while a luxury apartment complex named Gateway North opened on the east side the following fall.

References

Shopping malls in Florida
Demolished shopping malls in the United States
Outlet malls in the United States
Shopping malls established in 1984
2000 disestablishments in Florida
Buildings and structures in Pinellas County, Florida
1984 establishments in Florida
Shopping malls disestablished in 2000